Sotiris Kakisis (born 1954, Athens) is a contemporary Greek poet. He is a prolific translator, most notably of Ancient Greek lyric poetry (Sappho, Alcaeus, Hipponax, Mimnermus etc.). Kakisis has also translated into modern greek famous works by Lewis Carroll, Carlo Collodi, Lyman Frank Baum, James Thurber, Edward Gorey, Marcel Proust, and the "Complete Prose of" Woody Allen. He has had a long career in journalism, excelling as an interviewer, has written song lyrics, and has scripted several films, notably director Giorgos Panousopoulos' "Love Me Not?" and "Athens Blues". His adaptations of Euripides' Medea and Herondas' Mimiamboi have been stage-produced by the State Theater of Norway and the Greek National Theater, respectively.  The Greek National Theater presented the summer of 2020 at the Epidaurus ancient theater festival his translation of Aristophanes' Lysistrata and the summer of 2021 his translation of Aristophanes' The Knights.

References
Caterina Carpinato, Nuovi Narratori Greci, Theoria, Roma-Napoli 1993. 
Caterina Carpinato, Sotiris Kakisis, Foro Ellenico, Roma 2004. 
Maria Mussini, Letture e Traduzioni dai Lirici Greci nella Grecia di Oggi. Il caso di Sotiris Kakisis, Venezia 2011. 
Antologia de la Poesia Griega Moderna. Seaburn, New York 2012.
Sotiris Kakisis, Full Moon in the Forest (translation in English by Chronis Bertolis).Theorema, Brussels 2013.
Gilda Tentorio, Binari, Ruote & Ali in Grecia, Immagini Letterarie e Veicoli di Senso. UniversItalia 2015.
Cross-Section: An Anthology of Contemporary Greek Poetry. CreateSpace Independent Publishing Platform 2015.
P.J. Finglass and Adrian Kelly, The Cambridge Companion to Sappho. Cambridge University Press 2021

External links
1. Sotiris Kakisis, For Me, La Callas,'' translated by David Connoly 
2. 
3. Sotiris Kakisis. Lyrics. YouTube
4. Sotiris Kakisis. Author at Andro
5. Sotiris Kakisis. The poet who loves Water Polo

Scripts 
 
 
 

1954 births
Living people
Greek journalists
Greek lyricists
Greek translators
Modern Greek poets
Greek screenwriters
20th-century Greek poets
Writers from Athens